Tillandsia polystachia is a species of flowering plant in the genus Tillandsia. This species is native to Central America, the West Indies (Greater Antilles, Lesser Antilles, Bahamas), Bolivia, Colombia, Brazil, Ecuador, Mexico and Venezuela.

Cultivars
 Tillandsia 'Gusher'
 Tillandsia 'Polly Ellen'

References

polystachia
Flora of South America
Flora of Central America
Flora of Mexico
Flora of the Caribbean
Plants described in 1753
Taxa named by Carl Linnaeus
Epiphytes
Flora without expected TNC conservation status